Arboretum  is an electoral ward in the city of Derby, England.  The ward contains over 150 listed buildings that are recorded in the National Heritage List for England.   Of these, three are listed at Grade I, the highest of the three grades, 12 are at Grade II*, the middle grade, and the others are at Grade II, the lowest grade.  The ward contains the centre of the city and an area to the south, including Rose Hill.  Most of the listed buildings are houses and associated structures, shops, offices, public buildings, banks, public houses and hotels.  In the area near the railway stations is accommodation built for railway workers, now listed, and to the south of the centre is Derby Arboretum, which contains a variety of listed buildings.  The other listed buildings include Derby Cathedral, churches and associated structures, a former grammar school, a set of wrought iron gates by Robert Bakewell, bollards, a group of almshouses, a railway bridge, a market hall, a photographic studio, statues, a museum, a former theatre and war memorials.


Key

Buildings

References

Citations

Sources

 

Lists of listed buildings in Derbyshire
Listed buildings in Derby